Tombaugh is an impact crater on Mars, located in the Elysium quadrangle. It measures  in diameter and was named after Clyde Tombaugh, American astronomer (1906–1997), who discovered the dwarf planet Pluto. The name was approved by the International Astronomical Union (IAU) in 2006.

References

See also 
 Geology of Mars
 
 List of craters on Mars
 
 Ore resources on Mars
 Planetary nomenclature

Elysium quadrangle
Impact craters on Mars